"Run, Baby Run (Back Into My Arms)" is a song written by Joe Melson and Don Gant and performed by The Newbeats.  It reached #4 in Canada, #12 on the Billboard Hot 100, and #66 in Australia in 1965.  The song was also released in the United Kingdom as a single, but it did not chart on its original release.  The group re-released the song as the B-side to their 1971 single, "Am I Not My Brother's Keeper", and in that year, "Run, Baby Run (Back Into My Arms)" reached #10 in the U.K., following extensive playing in Northern Soul clubs in England.

The song was featured on their 1965 album, Run Baby Run.

Other versions
The Vogues released a version of the song on their 1966 album, Five O'Clock World.
Les Surfs released a version of the song entitled "Va Dove Vuoi" as the B-side to their 1966 single "Meritavi Molto Di Più".
The Tremeloes released as version of the song on their 1969 album, The Live in Cabaret.
Roy Orbison released a version of the song on his 1972 album, Memphis.

In media
The Newbeats version was featured in the 2010 film, The Ward.

References

1965 songs
1965 singles
1971 singles
Songs written by Joe Melson
The Newbeats songs
The Tremeloes songs
Roy Orbison songs
Songs written by Don Gant